Oplot can refer to:

BM Oplot, a modern version of the Ukrainian T-84 main battle tank
Oplot (Plzeň-South District), a village in the Czech Republic